The 1964 WANFL season was the 80th season of the various incarnations of the Western Australian National Football League.

Ladder

Finals

Grand Final

References

West Australian Football League seasons
WANFL